Victorian Flatbush is the western section of the Flatbush section of Brooklyn, New York, bordering Midwood, that is characterized by Victorian houses.

The neighborhoods of Victorian Flatbush were developed in the early twentieth century from farmland in the former village of Flatbush, in response to the construction of the Brooklyn Rapid Transit line to Coney Island, and were some of the earliest suburbs. Developers including Dean Alvord, Lewis Pounds and particularly Thomas Benton Ackerson sold the new developments as country living, under the name "The Village in the City". Utilities and the subway were buried underground, and the area was carefully laid out with tree-lined avenues, including the Flatbush Malls,  and country clubs. The detached houses, many of them large and no two alike, were designed in fashionable styles including "Victorian, Queen Anne, shingle style, colonial revival, neo-Tudor, Spanish Mission and Georgian", with porches and columns, and in many cases bay windows, turrets, and stained glass, and the area resembles other parts of the US more than it does the rest of New York. It is one of the largest collections of Victorian houses in the country. There has been rezoning to guard against oversize buildings near Coney Island Avenue.

Victorian Flatbush is in the western part of Flatbush, bounded approximately by Prospect Park (Brooklyn) or Church Avenue in the north and Avenue H in the south, and by Flatbush Avenue in the east and Coney Island Avenue in the west. It includes a dozen neighborhoods or enclaves:
 Albemarle-Kenmore Terraces, designated a New York City historic district in July 1978
 The Beverley Squares, Beverley Square East and Beverley Square West, major focuses of Ackerson's building
 Caton Park, sometimes called NoProPaSo (North of Prospect Park South)
 Ditmas Park, Ditmas Park Historic District designated a historic district in July 1981
 Ditmas Park West
 Fiske Terrace, designated a historic district in March 2008 with Midwood Park
 Midwood Park, designated a historic district in March 2008 with Fiske Terrace
 Newkirk
 Prospect Park South, designated a historic district in 1979
 South Midwood, bordering the Brooklyn College campus to the north
 West Midwood, with a large number of houses designed by Ackerson

The earliest development in Victorian Flatbush was the Tennis Court development, planned by Richard Ficken in the 1880s. These homes no longer exist, was they were bought and razed to build apartment buildings in the 1920s. The only remnants left of it are the eponymous street, and the Knickerbocker Field Club.

Many parts of Victorian Flatbush, particularly those centered on Cortelyou Road—Ditmas Park West and the Beverley Squares—are now usually thought of as part of Ditmas Park. It has also been identified with Midwood.

The Flatbush-Tompkins Congregational Church on 19th Street in the Ditmas Park Historic District, at which Conrad Tillard is since 2018 the Senior Minister, is often used for community meetings. Victorian Flatbush now includes five New York City historic districts, and residents of the sections that have not yet been designated city historic districts are working with the Flatbush Development Corporation and the Historic Districts Council to win designation.

References

Further reading
 2002 guide to Victorian Flatbush. Brooklyn: Flatbush Development Corporation, 2002.

External links
 Victorian Flatbush history site

Flatbush, Brooklyn
Neighborhoods in Brooklyn
Victorian architecture in New York City